Rear-Admiral Sir Edmund Affleck, 1st Baronet (19 April 1725 – 19 November 1788) was a naval officer of considerable repute.

Life
Affleck was born on 19 April 1725 the ninth son of the politician Gilbert Affleck (1684?–1764) of Dalham Hall. Affleck entered the navy at an early age, and during reign of George II, served in the several capacities of lieutenant, master and commander, and post captain. His first command of note was June 1756 when he took over HMS Albany a speedy 14-gun sloop.

In 1778 was given command of the 74 gun  and he briefly joined Vice-Admiral John Byron in North America before having to return for repairs. Affleck was with Sir Charles Hardy the following year before he was sent to relieve Gibraltar under the command of Sir George Rodney. Affleck's ship was noted for its ability to take the lead when attacking the Juan de Lángara's Spanish squadron during the Battle of St Vincent in 1780.

In 1781 he became a commodore and was briefly employed in New York, then being threatened by American rebels under George Washington. Surviving correspondence indicates Sir Edmund and General Washington to have been in contact regarding the treatment of prisoners of war. It was not, however, until the year 1782 had become – as it might be historically stated – a memorable epoch in the maritime annals of England, and that valour, ability, and boldness in battle, had retrieved for the nation its naval name, that opportunity had been afforded to Affleck to acquire celebrity and establish his professional fame.

About this period, his broad pennant (the commodore's symbol of office) was flying on board , attached to the fleet then employed in the West Indies, under the orders of Sir Samuel Hood. In the cautious and somewhat speculative encounter which took place in Basse-terre Roads, between Hood and the celebrated Count de Grasse, it fell to the lot, or – as he would have said himself – good fortune of Affleck, who each day commanded the rear division of the British line, to sustain the brunt of the enemy's attack. His conduct on this occasion drew from the commander-in-chief, a public expression of praise.

"The enemy," says Sir Samuel, in his official dispatches, "gave the preference to Commodore Affleck, but he kept up so noble a fire, and was so well supported by his seconds, Captain Cornwallis and Lord Robert Manners, that the loss and damage sustained in those ships were very trifling, and they very much preserved the other ships in the rear."

In furthering the fond aspirations of Affleck, time was any thing but tardy. On the 9 and 12 April ensuing, opportunity was again afforded him to increase his laurels. In the well-known conflicts that took place on those different days between Rodney and the Count de Grasse, and particularly in the memorable battle of the 12th, the commodore, in bringing up the rear of the centre division of the British fleet, manifested the noblest bearing. 

For the services rendered to his country in this glorious achievement, his sovereign conferred on him in 1782 the dignity of baronet of Britain; and out of compliment to his gallantry and general conduct, the electors of Colchester returned him the same year to represent that borough in parliament, which he did until his death. In turn, he attained his flag rank (in 1784), but in the capacity of admiral was never employed afloat.

In 1784 he bought Fingringhoe Hall in Essex. He died at his London house on 19 November 1788. He had married twice; firstly widow Hester Creffeild (née Hester Ruth) and secondly widow Margaret Smythies. He had only a daughter Charlotte and thus Fingringhoe Hall passed to the 2nd Baronet, Gilbert.

See also
Philip Affleck, his brother, the admiral.
HMS Affleck, named after Sir Edmund Affleck.

References

External links

18th-century British writers
Royal Navy rear admirals
British MPs 1780–1784
British MPs 1784–1790
Royal Navy personnel of the American Revolutionary War
Baronets in the Baronetage of Great Britain
Members of the Parliament of Great Britain for English constituencies
1725 births
1788 deaths